Diamond Your System Football Club is a football club based in Kota Kinabalu, Sabah, Malaysia. They played in the third-tier division in Malaysian football, the Malaysia FAM League in the 2016 season, before pulling out of the league in the next season.

Players

First-team squad

Transfers
For recent transfers, see List of Malaysian football transfers 2016 and List of Malaysian football transfers summer 2016

Coaches

Management team

Club personnel

 Manager: Muhammad Abdul Karim
 Head coach: Stanley Chew Boon Ming
 Assistant head coach: 
 Coach: Abdul Rahman Mad Noor
 Fitness Coach: 
 Goalkeeping coach: Irwan Jamil
 Head Physio: Noratiqah Alfia
 Physio: Muis Mursalam

References

External links
 Official Facebook Page

Malaysia FAM League clubs
Football clubs in Malaysia